Lionel Barnes, Jr. (born April 19, 1976 in New Orleans, Louisiana) is a former American football defensive end in the National Football League. He played for the St. Louis Rams, the Indianapolis Colts, and the Jacksonville Jaguars.

College career
Barnes played defensive end at the University of Louisiana-Monroe, leading the team in sacks with 16 in 1998, his senior season.

Professional career

Pre-draft

St. Louis Rams
Barnes was drafted by the Rams in the sixth round of the 1999 NFL Draft and was on the roster for two seasons, playing in four games.

Indianapolis Colts
After he was released by the Rams, the Colts signed Barnes and he played in seven games over the 2000 and 2001 NFL seasons.

Jacksonville Jaguars
In 2003, Barnes was signed by the Jacksonville Jaguars. In his first season there he played in 13 games and made 13 tackles plus two sacks. The following year, he earned the starting job and started the first three games of the season. The Jaguars placed Barnes on injured reserve  in mid-October because of a shoulder injury. Barnes was hurt September 19, 2004, against Denver.

On April 4, 2005, the Jacksonville Jaguars released Barnes.

References

1976 births
Living people
Players of American football from New Orleans
American football defensive ends
Louisiana–Monroe Warhawks football players
St. Louis Rams players
Indianapolis Colts players
Jacksonville Jaguars players